Martin Wesemann (born 19 March 1984) is a South African racing cyclist. He rode at the 2013 UCI Road World Championships.

Major results
2011
1st Deutsche Bank Cycle Tour
5th Overall Tour du Maroc
13th Overall Tour of China 
2012
13th Overall Tour du Maroc
13th Overall Flèche du Sud
2013
19th Overall Tour de Korea
1st Stage 5 (TTT)
2014
13th Overall Tour de Korea
2nd Stage 6

References

External links

1984 births
Living people
South African male cyclists
Sportspeople from Cape Town